Top Singer is a Malayalam musical reality television show broadcasting on Flowers TV. It was created and directed by Sindhu Sridhar. The contest premiered on 1 October 2018.

Episodes

Season 1 (2018–2019)

Top Actor Lalettan With Top Singers 

Padma Bhushan Lt. Col. Mohanlal was the chief guest for the Onam celebrations for Top Singer in 2019. The show was fully telecast on 11 September 2019 and parts of the show was split and re-telecast over the next few days.

Top Singers with Manju Warrier 

Manju Warrier was the chief guest for the Christmas celebrations for Top Singer in 2019.

References 

Lists of television episodes